William Arthur Henry Cavendish-Bentinck, 7th Duke of Portland,  (16 March 1893 – 21 March 1977), styled Marquess of Titchfield until 1943, was a British peer and Conservative Party politician.

Biography
Portland was the elder son of William Cavendish-Bentinck, 6th Duke of Portland, and his wife, Winifred Anna (née Dallas-Yorke). He was elected to the House of Commons as Member of Parliament (MP) for Newark in 1922, a seat he held until he succeeded his father in the dukedom in 1943, and served as a Junior Lord of the Treasury under Stanley Baldwin from 1927 to 1929 and under Ramsay MacDonald in 1932. He also held the honorary posts of Lord Lieutenant of Nottinghamshire between 1939 and 1962 and was the second Chancellor of the University of Nottingham between 1954 and 1971. In 1948 he was made a Knight of the Garter. He also held the appointment of the honorary air commodore of No. 616 Squadron RAF.

Marriage and children
Portland married Ivy Gordon-Lennox, daughter of Colonel Lord Algernon Charles Gordon-Lennox and granddaughter of Charles Gordon-Lennox, 6th Duke of Richmond, on 12 August 1915. They had two daughters:

 Lady (Alexandra Margaret) Anne Cavendish-Bentinck (6 September 1916 – 21 December 2008)
 Lady (Victoria) Margaret Cavendish-Bentinck (9 October 1918 – 29 August 1955)

He died in March 1977, aged 84, and was interred at the traditional burial place of the Dukes of Portland, in the churchyard of St Winifred's Church at Holbeck.

He was succeeded in the dukedom by his third cousin Ferdinand Cavendish-Bentinck. Subsidiary title Baron Bolsover became extinct on the death. The family seat of Welbeck Abbey passed to his elder daughter, Lady Anne, who never married; it then passed to the son of her deceased younger sister Lady Margaret who died 1955 aged 36. Her husband was Don Gaetano Parente, Principe di Castel Viscardo, Italy. The nephew's name was William Henry Marcello Parente (born 18 February 1951), who served as High Sheriff of Nottinghamshire in 2003–04.

Portland was a second cousin of Queen Elizabeth The Queen Mother.

Footnote

Wealth
Little is published of his wealth.

Ancestry

Arms

References

 http://www.nottshistory.org.uk/portland1907/portland1.htm "The Portland Peerage Romance (1907)"
 https://web.archive.org/web/20130113035008/http://www.angelfire.com/in/heinbruins/Bentinck.html "The Descendants of Willem Bentinck and Charlotte Aldenburg"
 Michael Rhodes "High Sheriffs for 2003-4" alt.talk.royalty, 21 March 2003
 Kidd, Charles, Williamson, David (editors). Debrett's Peerage and Baronetage (1990 edition). New York: St Martin's Press, 1990,

External links
 
William Cavendish-Bentinck, 7th Duke of Portland

1893 births
1977 deaths
William, 7th Duke of Portland
107
Honorary air commodores
Knights of the Garter
Cavendish-Bentinck, William
Lord-Lieutenants of Nottinghamshire
People from Welbeck
People from Bassetlaw District
People associated with the University of Nottingham
Cavendish-Bentinck, William
Cavendish-Bentinck, William
Cavendish-Bentinck, William
Cavendish-Bentinck, William
Cavendish-Bentinck, William
Cavendish-Bentinck, William
Portland, D7
Cavendish-Bentinck, William
English justices of the peace
British landowners
20th-century English nobility
People educated at Eton College